John Longhurst (born 1940) is an organist for the Tabernacle Choir from 1977 through 2007. He is also noted for writing the music to the Latter-day Saint hymn  "I Believe in Christ" and being one of the few main forces behind the design of the Conference Center organ.  He is the author of Magnum Opus: The Building of the Schoenstein Organ at the Conference Center of The Church of Jesus Christ of Latter-day Saints.
As a child, Longhurst lived on a ranch near Placerville, California. In 1949, his father died and the family subsequently moved to Salt Lake City, Utah. As a young man, Longhurst served as a missionary for the Church of Jesus Christ of Latter-day Saints in the Eastern Atlantic States Mission.

During the mid-1960s, Longhurst was a singing member of the Tabernacle Choir.

Longhurst earned bachelor's and master's degrees in music from the University of Utah and the Doctor of Musical Arts degree from the Eastman School of Music at the University of Rochester.  His principal organ teachers were Alexander Schreiner, David Craighead and Robert Noehren.

Between 1969 and 1977, Longhurst served on the music faculty at Brigham Young University.

Longhurst married Nancy Meldrim, a native of Syracuse, New York, in the Salt Lake Temple in 1969.  They are the parents of five children, one of whom died shortly after birth.

Notes

References 
 Church News, 2007-11-24, p. 7, 14

1940 births
20th-century Mormon missionaries
American Latter Day Saint hymnwriters
American Mormon missionaries in the United States
Place of birth missing (living people)
American organists
American male organists
Brigham Young University faculty
Living people
Tabernacle Choir organists
People from Placerville, California
Musicians from Salt Lake City
University of Utah alumni
University of Rochester alumni
21st-century organists
21st-century American keyboardists
Tabernacle Choir members
Male classical organists